The eighth season of Bad Girls Club is titled Bad Girls Club: Las Vegas and premiered on January 23, 2012 on the Oxygen channel. This is the third season to take place in a different location from Los Angeles, the first being season five (filmed in Miami), and the second being season seven (filmed in New Orleans). Production of the season began in late 2011, and was located in Las Vegas, Nevada.

Cast 
The season began with seven original bad girls, of which two left voluntarily and one was removed by production. Three replacement bad girls were introduced in their absences later in the season.

Duration of Cast

Episodes

Notes

References

External links 
 
 

2012 American television seasons
Bad Girls Club seasons
Television shows set in the Las Vegas Valley